Epeolini is a tribe of cuckoo bees, a tribe of the subfamily Nomadinae.

Genera
The tribe Epeolini is subdivided as follows:

Subtribe: Odyneropsina
Genus: Odyneropsis

Subtribe: Rhogepeolina
Genus: Rhogepeolus

Subtribe: Epeolina
Genus: Epeolus

Subtribe: Thalestriina
Genus: Doeringiella
Genus: Pseudepeolus
Genus: Triepeolus
Genus: Rhinepeolus
Genus: Thalestria

References

Nomadinae
Taxa named by Earle Gorton Linsley